The Ulster Constitution Defence Committee (UCDC) was established in Northern Ireland in April 1966.  The UCDC was the governing body of the loyalist Ulster Protestant Volunteers (UPV).  The UCDC coordinated parades, counter demonstrations, and paramilitary activities, in order to maintain the status quo of the government, lead a campaign against the reforms of Terence O'Neill, and stymie the civil rights movement.

Background 
The fourth Prime Minister of Northern Ireland, Terence O'Neill, who began his term in 1963, was trying to modernize industry to stave off an economic depression.  This modernization brought foreign industry to Northern Ireland and threatened the Protestant, Unionist, power base.  The Unionists held 90 percent of the jobs but foreign industries were hiring Catholics, thus reducing the strength of the Protestants.  In 1965, Terence O'Neill also invited and met with Sean Lemass, the Prime Minister of the  Republic of Ireland, to promote economic cooperation. The Unionists regarded the Republic of Ireland as the enemy and a report from Brian McConnell, the Home Affairs Minister, said there was a new IRA campaign of subversion.

Ian Paisley, a fundamentalist Presbyterian who was politically active, joined the Orange Order and supported the Unionist Party platform.  The fundamentalists were associated with 'traditional Unionism,' that supported the Protestant power base with its advantages in jobs, housing, and political power.  The ecumenical, liberal movement within Protestantism was thought to be aligning with the political elite and with the Catholics, thereby threatening the advantages enjoyed by working-class Protestants.  Ian Paisley's attempt to put four candidates into an election ended up with him withdrawing them when he identified the need for an electoral machine to obtain votes in the Westminster general election.(Boulton 34)

Noel Doherty, a member of Ian Paisley's Free Presbyterian Church of Ulster since 1956, was also a printer who with Paisley formed the Puritan Printing Company and created the first edition of the Protestant Telegraph in May 1966.   Doherty was a great admirer or Gusty Spence, a member of the Ulster Protestant Action.  Spence was a much harder character who recreated the Ulster Volunteer Force (UVF) in March 1966, just prior to the creation of the UCDC.  Doherty would propose the political vehicle Ian Paisley needed but Doherty's motives were more aligned with Spence than with Paisley.  Doherty used his position of trust with Paisley and began to organise a network of the 'Ulster Protestant Volunteer Corps' about two months prior to the creation of the UCDC.

Organization 
Ian Paisley met with fellow loyalists including Noel Doherty in April 1966, when he discussed a proposal by Doherty to create the Ulster Constitution Defence Committee.  Paisley was made the Chairman and a "12-man united society of Protestant patriots pledged by all lawful methods to uphold and maintain the constitution of Northern Ireland" (also known as "the 12 disciples") was created.  Doherty was made the Secretary.(Boulton 34-36)

UCDC Debut 
The public debut of the UCDC took place on the Shankill Road (West Belfast) on 17 April 1966, in the form of a parade led by Ian Paisley and Noel Doherty.  Members of both Doherty's and Spence's newly created organizations participated in the parade and were publicly thanked by Paisley.

Organizing the UPV
In May 1966, the UCDC decided to organize Doherty's  Ulster Protestant Volunteers (UPV), which was a loyalist paramilitary group, into local branches, which were called divisions.  The UPV was under the governance of the UCDC, binding it by a constitution which condemned illegal violence.(Boulton 38).  Only Protestants were allowed to join and Roman Catholics along with members of the RUC were automatically excluded.

Activities 
Noel Doherty made it difficult to separate the activities of the UCDC/UPV from the activities of the UVF.  He asked members of the UVF and the Armagh Free Presbyterian Church to attend a meeting where the Loughgall division of the UPV would be created.  During the meeting both guns and gelignite were discussed, along with reprisals against the IRA.  Doherty chaired the meeting but Ian Paisley was not there, and later denied any knowledge, which was supported by Doherty.

Despite the UCDC's disassociation with violence and illegal activities, divisions of the UPV under control of the UCDC were linked with petrol bomb attacks on Catholic schools, shops, bars and homes in the Spring of 1966.(Coogan 49,50)  The Royal Ulster Constabulary (RUC) investigated.  Five of these attacks were in April and the 1st week of May.

Noel Doherty facilitated the Loughgall division of the UPV and Gusty Spence's Shankill Ulster Volunteer Force (UVF) working together.(Boulton 41)  Doherty introduced a quarryman who supplied the explosive, gelignite and detonators to members of the UVF. (Boulton 42)

Disassociation with the UVF 
Paisley organized a picket against a liberal church parade on 6 April 1966. He felt that the church supported Terrence O'Neill's political viewpoint which Paisley opposed.  The parade went through a catholic area and a riot broke out (the Presbyterian General Assembly riot).  Four policemen were badly injured which began an open hostility between the RUC and Paisley.  The Orange Order, the liberal Presbyterian Church and official unionism disassociated themselves from Paisley and said his organizations "represent a defiance of lawful authority no less serious in essence than that of the IRA."

A murder outside a bar known as the Malvern Arms was investigated and the UCDC, led by Ian Paisley was implicated but he denied any knowledge.  Gusty Spence, Hugh McClean and Robert Williamson from the UVF, shot four barmen they presumed were IRA men.  Off duty RUC men were in the back room of the bar and arrests were made.  The three gunmen were convicted and sentenced to life imprisonment.

Terrence O'Neill banned the UVF under the Civil Authorities (Special Powers) Act of 1932.   The UCDC and the UPV were not banned but O'Neill made many attempts to tie the organizations together, implying that Ian Paisley was the leader.  Ian Paisley denied any connection with the UVF.  He and James McConnell, the vice-chairman of the UCDC, expelled Doherty from the UCDC.(Boulton 54)   Four days after the murder conviction, Noel Doherty was sentenced to two years on an explosive charge.  The quarryman who supplied the explosives, Jim Marshall was fined £200.

Ian Paisley was sent to jail on 19 July 1966 for refusing to sign a pledge of good behaviour after the Presbyterian General Assembly Riot.  As a result, protests, parades and riots ensued.  On Paisley's release on 19 October, his supporters celebrated all over Protestant Belfast.  A public opinion poll indicated that 200,000 of Ulster's million Protestants considered themselves as potential Paisley supporters.

Early clashes between Catholics and Protestants were reported on 7 March 1967.

Counter demonstrations 
The Northern Ireland civil rights movement was founded in February 1967. It was made up from three distinct social groups: the Catholic middle class; the students of Queen's University; and the working class in the Catholic ghettos. It also included the remnants of the old IRA. The Northern Ireland Civil Rights Association (NICRA), chaired by Mrs. Betty Sinclair, was slow starting. When it did start marching, the result was bloody clashes with the various Protestant organizations. (Boulton 66-67)

The first civil rights march was scheduled for August 24, 1968.  It was supposed to proceed from Coalisland to Dungannon by going through Market Square and the town centre.  The UCDC/UPC convinced the police to re-route the march through the Catholic part of town.  The marchers were met at the outskirts of Dungannon by the police and a large group made up mainly by the Ulster Protestant Volunteers.  The police managed to keep both groups apart but were abused by both sides.  At the conclusion of the demonstration, the executives of the UCDC thanked the UPV members for their support and stated that, "The policy of the UCDC, through the UPC, has been and will continue to be to confront the enemy at every opportunity." (Boulton 69)

The next civil rights march was banned as it was supposed to parade through part of Derry within the city walls. This was considered 'sacred' ground by the Protestants and not only the UPV but by all the unionists and the police.  The marchers ignored the order and were confronted by the RUC riot squad where 90 marchers and 18 police were injured.
"Meanwhile, students at Queens University here announced they would hold a rally of about 1,500 people to protest reported police brutality.  A rival meeting was planned by the Ulster (Northern Ireland) Constitution Defense Committee."

Another NICRA demonstration in Belfast on 9 October 1968 was blocked by a crowd led by Ian Paisley. Derry was the site of numerous other civil rights marches and counter marches by the UCDC/UPV.  The battles were having a political impact and Terrence O'Neill was a central figure in supporting the reforms to try to control the situation between the civil rights groups and the UCDC/UPV along with other Protestant groups.

Reforms 
The UCDC was used to lead the campaign against the reforms of the Prime Minister of Northern Ireland, Terence O'Neill, in the late 1960s.(Coogan 51)

The reforms requested were as follows:
Reform the voting wards within Derry.
One-man, one-vote
A reformed system of housing allocations
Abolition of the Special Powers Act
Appointment of an Ombudsman

O'Neill proposed reforms that resembled those requested but the proposal toned down the requests leaving neither side satisfied.  The UPV issued a statement that inflamed the situation.

Bombings 
A series of bomb attacks against local power and water distribution were attributed to the UCDC/UPC and the outlawed UVF.  The attacks were considered to cause civil disruption with the result to force Terrence O'Neill to resign.  Court trials found most of the defendants not-guilty so the attacks could not be linked to one or more Protestant extremist groups.
	
O'Neill resigned in April 1969 after he was nearly defeated in his area by Ian Paisley.

Notes

References 
Boulton, David. The UVF 1966-73, An Anatomy of Loyalist Rebellion. Dublin: Torc Books, 1973.
Coogan, Tim Pat. The Troubles, Ireland's Ordeal 1966-1996 and the Search for Peace. Colorado: Roberts Rinehart Publishers, 1996.
Melaugh, Martin. "Cain, Abstracts of Organizations.", "Cain, Abstracts of Organizations -U-",11/20/2007, CAIN Web Services, retrieved 2/22/2008

External links
Anthony Babington,"Military Intervention in Britain: From the ...", 1990, Google Book Search
Margaret O'Callaghan - Dr. O'Donnell, "The Northern Ireland Government, the 'Paisleyite Movement' and Ulster Unionism in 1966", Irish Political Studies, Volume 21, Issue 2 June 2006, pages 203 - 222
Brian Dooley,"Black and Green: The Fight for Civil Rights in Northern Ireland...", 1998, Google Book Search
Jacqueline Dana, "A Brief History of Orangeism in Ireland", 1998, Larkspirit.com

The Troubles (Northern Ireland)
Ulster Volunteer Force
Anti-Catholicism in Northern Ireland
Far-right politics in Northern Ireland
Christian fundamentalism
Ulster unionist organisations